Brazil once had the highest deforestation rate in the world and in 2005 still had the largest area of forest removed annually. According to official data, about 729,000 km² have already been deforested in the Amazon biome, which corresponds to 17% of the total. 300,000 km2 have been deforested in the last 20 years.

Rainforests have decreased in size primarily due to deforestation. According to the Living Planet Report 2010, deforestation continues at an alarming rate. At the Convention on Biological Diversity's 9th Conference, 67 ministers signed up to help achieve zero net deforestation by 2020. Due to deforestation the Amazon was a net emitter of greenhouse gas in the 2010s.

History

The deforestation of the Atlantic forest, or Mata Atlântica, dates back to Portuguese colonization and the subsequent rapid development of urban centers. Before human-modification, the forest covered around 17% of Brazil's area. Unlike the Amazon, which has only faced extreme deforestation in recent years, the Atlantic Forest has been a long-lasting target for land development, speculation, and agricultural endeavors. Starting during the sixteenth century, the forest began facing pressure due to the unsustainable development of coffee, sugarcane, brazilwood, and cattle in the region.

In the 1940s Brazil began a program of national development in the Amazon Basin. President Getúlio Vargas declared emphatically that:

Before the 1960s, much of the forest remained intact due to restrictions on access to the Amazon beyond partial clearing along the river banks. The poor soil made plantation-based agriculture unprofitable. The key point in deforestation of the Amazon came when colonists established farms in the forest in the 1960s. They farmed based on crop cultivation and used the slash and burn method. The colonists were unable to successfully manage their fields and the crops due to weed invasion and loss of soil fertility. Soils in the Amazon are productive for only a very short period of time after the land is cleared, so farmers there must constantly move and clear more and more land.

Amazonian colonization was dominated by cattle raising, not only because grass did grow in the poor soil, but also because ranching required little labor, generated decent profit, and awarded social status. However, farming led to extensive deforestation and environmental damage.

An estimated 30% of deforestation is due to small farmers; the rate of deforestation in areas they inhabit is greater than in areas occupied by medium and large ranchers, who own 89% of the Legal Amazon's private land. This underlines the importance of using previously cleared land for agriculture, rather than the usual, politically easier path of distributing still-forested areas. The number of small farmers versus large landholders fluctuates with economic and demographic pressures.

Causes

Cattle ranching and infrastructure
Livestock and agriculture have never been very strong in the Amazon: the area has a bad soil and climate for planting, and cattle, although they reach the margins of the forest, are actually spread throughout the country, being the areas that have less cattle throughout Brazil, coastal regions and the Amazon. States like Goiás, Mato Grosso do Sul and Minas Gerais have a lot of cattle. The annual rate of deforestation in the Amazon region continued to increase from 1990 to 2003 because of factors at local, national, and international levels. Seventy per cent of formerly forested land in the Amazon, and 91% of land deforested since 1970, is used for livestock pasture. The Brazilian government initially attributed 38% of all forest loss between 1966 and 1975 to large-scale cattle ranching. According to the Center for International Forestry Research (CIFOR), "between 1990 and 2001 the percentage of Europe's processed meat imports that came from Brazil rose from 40 to 74 percent" and by 2003 "for the first time ever, the growth in Brazilian cattle production, 80 percent of which was in the Amazon[,] was largely export driven."

Forest removal to make way for cattle ranching was the leading cause of deforestation in the Brazilian Amazon from the mid-1960s on. In addition to Vargas's earlier goal of commercial development, the devaluation of the Brazilian real against the dollar had the result of doubling the price of beef in reals; this gave ranchers a widespread incentive to increase the size of their cattle ranches and areas under pasture for mass beef production, resulting in large areas of forest removal.

Removal of forest cover for cattle farming in Brazil was also seen by developers as an economic investment during periods of high inflation, when appreciation of cattle prices provided a way to outpace the interest earned on money left in the bank. Brazilian beef was more competitive on the world market at a time when extensive improvements in the road network in the Amazonas (such as the introduction of the Trans-Amazonian Highway in the early 1970s) gave potential developers access to vast areas of previously inaccessible forest. This coincided with lower transportation costs due to cheaper fuels such as ethanol, which lowered the costs of shipping the beef and further incentivized the development of remote forested areas.

Cattle ranching is not an environmentally friendly investment because cattle emit large amounts of methane. These emissions play a major role in climate change because methane's ability to trap heat is 20 times greater than that of carbon dioxide in a time horizon of 100 years and exponentially higher in shorter time horizons. One cow can emit up to 130 gallons of methane a day, just by belching.

The Brazilian government granted land to approximately 150,000 families in the Amazon between 1995 and 1998. Poor farmers were also encouraged by the government through programmes such as the National Institute for Colonization and Agrarian Reform in Brazil (INCRA) to farm unclaimed forest land and after a five-year period were given a title and the right to sell the land. The productivity of the soil following forest removal for farming lasts only a year or two before the fields become infertile and farmers must clear new areas of forest to maintain their income. In 1995, nearly half (48%) of the deforestation in Brazil was attributed to poorer farmers clearing lots under  in size.

Mining
Mining has also increased deforestation in the Brazilian Amazon, particularly since the 1980s, with miners often clearing forest to open the mines or to provide building material, collecting wood for fuel and subsistence agriculture. In September 2017, the government withdrew this permission.

Soybean production

Brazil is currently the second-largest global producer of soybeans after the United States, mostly for livestock feed. As stated in the Constitution of Brazil, clearing land for crops or fields is considered an "effective use" of land and is the first step toward land ownership. Cleared property is also valued 5–10 times more than forested land, and for that reason is valuable to the owner whose ultimate objective is resale. The soy industry is an important exporter for Brazil; therefore, the needs of soy farmers have been used to validate many of the controversial transportation projects being developed in the Amazon.

However, the Amazonian soil is of very low quality for plantations: it has few nutrients and the soil is sterile after two or three years of planting. In 2020, only 5% of the country's agricultural production came from the Northern Region. Most of the soy plantation in the country is practiced in the region of Cerrado, a savanna with little vegetation that was barren and where agriculture was impractical until a few years ago. Thanks to EMBRAPA, Brazil adapted plants for cultivation in this region, since Brazil has many terrible biomes for the practice of agriculture and livestock, such as the Semi-Arid Region of the Northeast, the Amazon Forest itself or the mountainous plateaus in the Southeast.

Cargill, a multinational company which controls the majority of the soya bean trade in Brazil, has been criticized, along with fast food chains like McDonald's, by Greenpeace for accelerating the deforestation of the Amazon. Cargill is the main supplier of soya beans to large fast food companies such as McDonald's which use the soy products to feed their cattle and chickens. As fast-food chains expand, the chains must increase the quantity of their livestock in order to produce more products. In order to meet the resulting demand for soya, Cargill has expanded its soy production by clear-cutting parts of the Amazon.

A report by Greenpeace mentions that European supermarket giant Tesco told Greenpeace that 99% of its soya footprint is made up of animal feed. This is responsible for more than 500,000 tonnes of soya imports into the UK each year, making up more than a sixth of the total.

The same report by Greenpeace also mentions that animal feed for meat production is Europe's largest contribution to deforestation, with soya imports representing 47% of Europe’s deforestation footprint, compared to 14% for pasture expansion for livestock and 10% for palm oil. Greenpeace called for "a new EU law to protect forests by keeping any product that comes from forest destruction off the European market."

In 2020, the Amsterdam Declarations Partnership (which includes Germany, France, Denmark, Italy, Norway, the UK and the Netherlands) sent an open letter to vice president Hamilton Mourão, stating that Brazil's backwards moves in environmental protection were threatening Europe's desire to source its food sustainably.

The first two highways, the Rodovia Belém-Brasília (1958) and the Cuiabá-Porto Velho (1968), were the only federal highways in the Legal Amazon to be paved and passable year-round before the late 1990s. These two highways are said to be "at the heart of the ‘arc of deforestation’" that is the epicenter of deforestation in the Brazilian Amazon.  The Belém-Brasília Highway attracted nearly two million settlers in its first twenty years. The success of the Belém-Brasília highway in opening up the forest was re-enacted as paved roads continued to be developed, unleashing the irrepressible spread of settlement. The completion of the roads were followed by a wave of resettlement and the settlers had a significant effect on the forest.

Scientists using NASA satellite data have found that clearing for mechanized cropland has recently become a significant force in Brazilian Amazon deforestation. This change in land use may alter the region's climate and the land's ability to absorb carbon dioxide. Researchers found that in 2003, the peak year of deforestation, more than 20 percent of the Mato Grosso state's forests were converted to cropland. This finding suggests that the recent cropland expansion in the region is contributing to further deforestation. In 2005, soybean prices fell by more than 25 percent and some areas of Mato Grosso showed a decrease in large deforestation events, although the central agricultural zone continued to clear forests. But, deforestation rates could return to the high levels seen in 2003 as soybean and other crop prices begin to rebound in international markets. Brazil has become a leading worldwide producer of grains including soybean, which accounts for 5% of the nation's exports. This new driver of forest loss suggests that the rise and fall of prices for other crops, beef and timber may also have a significant impact on future land use in the region, according to the study.

Logging

The export of tree trunks native to the Amazon (selling fresh wood, that is, without any type of processing), is an illegal activity in Brazil. However, it is common to see, in Europe, the sale of furniture produced with illegal Brazilian woods, such as jacaranda and mahogany. Timber arrives illegally in Europe and the countries of the continent do not take action to block these imports. Logging in Brazil's Amazon is economically motivated. The economic opportunity for developing regions is driven by timber export and demand for charcoal. Charcoal-producing ovens use large amounts of timber. In one month, the Brazilian government destroyed 800 illegal ovens in Tailândia. These 800 ovens were estimated to consume about 23,000 trees per month.  Logging for timber export is selective, since only a few species, such as mahogany, have commercial value and are harvested. Selective logging still does a lot of damage to the forest. For every tree harvested, 5-10 other trees are logged, to transport the logs through the forest. Also, a falling tree takes down a lot of other small trees. A logged forest contains significantly fewer species than areas where selective logging has not taken place. A forest disturbed by selective logging is also significantly more vulnerable to fire.

Logging in the Amazon, in theory, is controlled and only strictly licensed individuals are allowed to harvest the trees in selected areas. In practice, illegal logging is widespread in Brazil. Up to 60 to 80 percent of all logging in Brazil is estimated to be illegal, with 70% of the timber cut wasted in the mills. Most illegal logging companies are international companies that don't replant the trees and the practice is extensive. Expensive wood such as mahogany is illegally exported to profit these companies. Fewer trees mean that less photosynthesis will occur and therefore oxygen levels drop. Carbon dioxide emissions increase, as this gas is released from a tree when it's cut down and burned or left to rot. A tree can absorb as much as 48 pounds of carbon per year so illegal logging has a major impact on climate change.

To combat this destruction, the Brazilian government has stopped issuing new permits for logging. Unauthorized harvesting has continued nonetheless. Efforts to prevent cutting down forests include payments to landowners. Instead of banning logging altogether, the government hopes payments of comparable sums will dissuade owners from further deforestation.

COVID-19 
The COVID-19 pandemic has increased deforestation in Brazil. The government has been preoccupied by the global pandemic, and unchecked illegal activity has taken place. “The trend line is shooting upward compared to a year that was already historic in terms of a rise in deforestation,” said federal prosecutor Ana Carolina Haliuc Bragança.“If state entities don’t adopt very decisive measures, we’re looking at a likely tragedy.”

Climate change 
Climate change plays a significant role in the wildfires in the Pantanal.

Effects

Deforestation and loss of biodiversity have led to high risks of irreversible changes to the Amazon's tropical forests. It has been suggested by modeling studies that the deforestation may be approaching a "tipping point", after which large-scale "savannization" or desertification of the Amazon will take place, with catastrophic consequences for the world's climate, due to a self-perpetuating collapse of the region's biodiversity and ecosystems. In 2018, about 17% of the Amazon rainforest was already destroyed. Research suggests that upon reaching about 20–25%, the tipping point to flip it into a non-forest ecosystems (in eastern, southern and central Amazonia) could be reached.

The result of passing the tipping point will be catastrophic for both and will hurt global food security. Carlos Nobres, a climate scientist, said: “Brazil should be battling the most [to protect the Amazon], because it has the most to lose,”. Experts note that avoiding deforestation and climate change is a top interest of the agricultural sector. This is something that's only been expedited by the current president of Brazil, Jair Bolsonaro, with major staff and budgeting cuts in relation to environmental enforcement.

Climate change 

Carbon present in the trees is essential for ecosystem development and plays a key role in the regional and global climate. Fallen leaves from deforestation leave behind a mass of dead plant material known as slash, which on decomposition provides a food source for invertebrates. This has the indirect effect of increasing atmospheric carbon dioxide levels through respiration and microbial activity. Simultaneously the organic carbon in the soil structure becomes depleted; the presence of carbon plays a vital role in the functioning of life in any ecosystem.

Biodiversity 
Rainforests are the oldest ecosystems on earth. Rainforest plants and animals continue to evolve, developing into the most diverse and complex ecosystems on earth. Living in limited areas, most of these species are endemic, found nowhere else in the world. In tropical rainforests, an estimated 90% of the species of the ecosystem live in the canopy. Since tropical rainforests are estimated to hold 50% of the planet's species, the canopy of rainforests worldwide may hold 45% of life on Earth. The Amazon rainforest borders eight countries, and has the world's largest river basin and is the source of 1/5 of the Earth's river water. It has the world's greatest diversity of birds and freshwater fish. The Amazon is home to more species of plants and animals than any other terrestrial ecosystem on the planet—perhaps 30% of the world's species are found there.

More than 300 species of mammals are found in the Amazon, the majority of them bats and rodents. The Amazon basin contains more freshwater fish species than anywhere else in the world—more than 3,000 species. More than 1,500 bird species are also found there. Frogs are overwhelmingly the most abundant amphibians in the rainforest. Species interdependence takes many forms in the forest, from species relying on other species for pollination and seed dispersal to predator-prey relationships and symbiotic relationships. Each species that disappears from the ecosystem may weaken the survival chances of another, while the loss of a keystone species—an organism that links many other species together—could cause a significant disruption in the functioning of the entire system.

Indigenous people 
A WRI report mentions that “tenure-secure” indigenous lands generates billions and sometimes trillions of dollars’ worth of benefits in the form of carbon sequestration, reduced pollution, clean water and more. It says that 
tenure-secure indigenous lands have low deforestation rates, they help to reduce GHG emissions, control erosion and flooding by anchoring soil, and provide a suite of other local, regional and global “ecosystem services.”
However, many of these communities find themselves on the front lines of the deforestation crisis, and their lives and livelihoods threatened.

On March 30, 2020, land defender Zezico Guajajara's body was found near his village. Zezico was a member of the protected Guajajara Tribe in the Amazon who started the Guardians of the Forest in 2012.

Land degradation 
Deforestation for the export of timber removes valuable protection for the soils in a dynamic ecosystem; thus regions are prone to desertification and silting of river banks as rivers become clogged with eroded soils in sparse areas. If too much timber is cut, soil that once had sufficient cover can get baked and dry out in the sun, leading to erosion and degradation of soil fertility; this means farmers cannot profit from their land even after clearing it. According to the United Nations Environmental Programme (UNEP) in 1977, deforestation is a major cause of desertification and in 1980 threatened 35% of the world's land surface and 20% of the world's population.

Pollution 

Exploitation of forests for mining activities such as gold mining has also significantly increased the risk of mercury poisoning and contamination of the ecosystem and water. Mercury poisoning can affect the food chain and affect wildlife both on land and in the rivers. It can also affect plants and the crops of farmers trying to farm forest areas. Pollution may result from mine sludge and affect the functioning of the river system when exposed soil is blown in the wind and can have a significant impact on aquatic populations further affected by dam building in the region. Dams may have a profound impact on migrating fish and ecological life and leave plains prone to flooding and leaching.

In August 2019, smoke from wildfires in Brazil's rainforests became so thick that it arrived in São Paulo and plunged the city into darkness in the middle of the day for an hour, prompting the spread of the hashtag "prayforamazonia" on social media.

Drought 
The deforestation of the Amazon has already had a significant negative impact on Brazil's freshwater supply, harming, among others, the agricultural industry that has contributed to the clearing of the forests. In 2005, parts of the Amazon basin experienced the worst drought in more than a century. This has been the result of two factors:

 The rainforest provides much of the rainfall in Brazil, even in areas far from it. Deforestation increased the impacts of the droughts of 2005, 2010, and 2015–2016.
 The rainforest, by inducing rainfall and helping with water storage, provides freshwater to the rivers that give water to Brazil and other countries.

Even modest increases in Amazon forest loss may reduce water supplies in Brazilian cities and in neighboring countries. More massive deforestation could alter water supplies as far away as Africa or California.

As of 2020 deforestation in Brazil is close to reach a tipping point after which the forest will change to savanna. The result of passing such tipping point will be catastrophic for the agriculture and hydroelectricity in Brazil. Already both sectors are severely hurt. For example, the rainy season has been shortened by 15 – 30 days in 40 years, the amount of rainfall decreased, the harvest became lower in many areas, the mega dam Belo Monte can produce less power. In the future, the soya sector can lose 40% of productivity even in areas with low risk, the hydroelectric sector more than 80%. The lack of water can cause water conflict between the different sectors of the economy. Also passing the tipping point will hurt global food security.

Rainforests are home to a wide range of animal and plant species and an enormous biodiversity. They are also hugely important for absorbing carbon dioxide and returning it to oxygen. The loss of the Amazon rainforests would mean an acceleration of climate change and cause the world's weather patterns to be much more unstable.

Carlos Nobre, a climate scientist says: “Brazil should be battling the most [to protect the Amazon] because it has the most to lose.” Experts note that avoiding deforestation and climate change is a top interest of the agricultural sector because it existence depending on it.

In 2022 study found that 28% of the agricultural land in Brazil is no more climatically optimal due to climate change and to change in local climate as a result of deforestation. The number will go to 51% by 2030 and 74% by 2060 if the change in climate will continue in the same way. Brazil has a strong interest in forest conservation as its agriculture sector directly depends on its forests.

Temperature 
In 2019, a group of scientists published research suggesting that in a "business as usual" scenario, the deforestation of the Amazon Rainforest would raise the temperature in Brazil by 1.45 degrees. They wrote: "Increased temperatures in already hot locations may increase human mortality rates and electricity demands, reduce agricultural yields and water resources, and contribute to biodiversity collapse, particularly in tropical regions. Furthermore, local warming may cause shifts in species distributions, including for species involved in infectious disease transmissions." The authors of the paper say that deforestation is already causing a rise in the temperature.

NASA survey

In the American Meteorological Society Journal of Climate, two research meteorologists at NASA's Goddard Space Flight Center, Andrew Negri and Robert Adler, have analysed the impact of deforestation on climatic patterns in the Amazon using data and observatory readings collected from NASA's Tropical Rainfall Measuring Mission over many years.
Working with the University of Arizona and the North Carolina State University, Negri said, "In deforested areas, the land heats up faster and reaches a higher temperature, leading to localized upward motions that enhance the formation of clouds and ultimately produce more rainfall".

They also examined cloud cover in deforested areas. In comparison with areas still unaffected by deforestation, they found a significant increase in cloud cover and rainfall during the August–September wet season where the forest had been cleared. The height or existence of plants and trees in the forest directly affects the aerodynamics of the atmosphere, and precipitation in the area. In addition, the Massachusetts Institute of Technology developed a series of detailed computer simulation models of rainfall patterns in the Amazon during the 1990s and concluded that forest removal also leaves soil exposed to the sun, and the increased temperature on the surface enhances evaporation and increases moisture in the air.

Rates

Deforestation rates in the Brazilian Amazon have slowed dramatically since peaking in 2004 at 27,423 square kilometers per year.  By 2009, deforestation had fallen to around 7,000 square kilometers per year, a decline of nearly 75 percent from 2004, according to Brazil's National Institute for Space Research (Instituto Nacional de Pesquisas Espaciais, or INPE), which produces deforestation figures annually.

Their deforestation estimates are derived from 100 to 220 images taken during the dry season in the Amazon by the China–Brazil Earth Resources Satellite program (CBS), and may only consider the loss of the Amazon rainforest – not the loss of natural fields or savanna within the Amazon biome. According to INPE, the original Amazon rainforest biome in Brazil of 4,100,000 km2 was reduced to 3,403,000 km2 by 2005 – representing a loss of 17.1%.

In 2018, Brazil released its worst annual deforestation figures in a decade amid fears that the situation might worsen when the avowedly anti-environmentalist president-elect Jair Bolsonaro took power.  Between August 2017 and July 2018, 7,900 km2 were deforested, according to preliminary figures from the environment ministry based on satellite monitoring – a 13.7% rise from the previous year and the biggest area of forest cleared since 2008. The area is equivalent to 987,000 football pitches. Deforestation in the Brazilian Amazon rose more than 88% in June 2019 compared with the same month in 2018. In the year 2019 approximately 9,762 square kilometers of the Amazonian forest were destroyed, 30% more than in the previous year. Environmental groups, scientists accused the policy of the government of Bolsonaro that rejected the blames. In January 2020, deforestation more than doubled compared with the previous year. From August 2020 to July 2021, INPE recorded 13,235sq km of deforestation. In January 2022, according to government data, Brazil recorded the most deforestation in the Amazon rainforest for the month of January since the current data series began in 2015/2016.

Estimates of the rates of deforestation in the Amazon rainforest from 1970 thru 2017 are given in the table below, based on data from the National Institute for Space Research and the Food and Agriculture Organization (FAO).

Response

By the end of the 1980s, the removal of Brazil's forests had become a serious global issue, not only because of the loss of biodiversity and ecological disruption, but also because of the large amounts of carbon dioxide (CO2) released from burned forests and the loss of a valuable sink to absorb global CO2 emissions.  At the 1992 UN Framework Convention on Climate Change, deforestation became a key issue addressed at the summit in Rio de Janeiro. Plans for the compensated reduction (CR) of greenhouse gas emissions from tropical forests were set up to give nations like Brazil an incentive to curb their rate of deforestation.

"We are encouraging the Brazilian government to fully endorse the Compensated Reduction proposal", said scientist Paulo Moutinho, coordinator of the climate change program of the Amazon  (IPAM), an NGO research institute in Brazil.

On May 11, 1994, NASA scientists, Compton Tucker and David Skole concluded that satellite observations showed a reduction in the rate of forest removal between 1992 and 1993 and that World Bank estimates of 600,000 square km2 (12%) cleared to that point appeared to be too high. The NASA assessment concurred with the findings of the Brazilian National Space Research Institute (INPE) of an estimated 280,000 km2 (5%) in the same period.

The following year (1995) deforestation nearly doubled; this has been attributed to the accidental fire following the El Niño-related drought rather than active logging; the following year again showed a major drop. In 2002, Brazil ratified the Kyoto Agreement as a developing nation listed in the non-Annex I countries. These countries do not have carbon emission quotas in the agreement as developed nations do. President Luiz Inácio Lula da Silva reiterated that Brazil: "is in charge of looking after the Amazon".

In 2006, Brazil proposed a direct finance project to deal with the Reduced Emissions from Deforestation and Degradation in Developing Countries, or REDD, issue, recognizing that deforestation contributes to 20% of the world's greenhouse gas emissions. The competing proposal for the REDD issue was a carbon emission credit system, where reduced deforestation would receive "marketable emissions credits". In effect, developed countries could reduce their carbon emissions, and approach their emissions quota by investing in the reforestation of developing rainforest countries. Instead, Brazil's 2006 proposal would draw from a fund based on donor country contributors.

The academic evidence suggests that the creation of public lands, through the assignment of property rights, reduces incentives to deforest land for agricultural conversion and contributes to lower land-related conflict.

Between 2005 and 2006 there was a 41% drop in deforestation; nonetheless, Brazil still had the largest area of forest removed annually on the planet.

These methods have also reduced the illegal appropriation of land and logging, encouraging the use of land for sustainable timber harvesting.

At the end of August 2019 after an international outcry and warning from experts that fires can increase even more, the Brazilian government of Jair Bolsonaro begun to take measures to stop the fires in the Amazon rainforest. The measures include:

 60 day ban for clearing forest with fires.
 Sending 44,000 soldiers to fight the fires.
 Accepting 4 planes from Chile for battle the fires.
 Accepting 12 million dollars of aid from the United Kingdom government
 Softening his position about aid from the G7.
 Appealing for a Latin America conference to preserve the Amazon

2019

To diminish deforestation in the Brazilian Amazon, some organisations have argued that large financial resources are required to give illegal loggers an economic incentive to pursue other areas of activity. The World Wide Fund for Nature (WWF) estimated in 2007 that a total of approximately US$547.2 million (1 billion Brazilian reais) per year would be required from international sources to compensate the forest developers and establish a highly organized framework to fully implement forest governance and monitoring, and the foundation of new protected forest areas in the Amazon for future sustainability.

Non-governmental organizations (NGOs) such as WWF have been active in the region, and WWF Brazil formed an alliance with eight other Brazilian NGOs who aimed to completely halt deforestation in the Amazon by 2015. However, deforestation continues; in July 2019, the rate reached a four-year high. Deforestation has rapidly increased over 30 percent since 2018 according to the INPE. The Amazon's deforestation has been seen to be at its highest levels since 2008. This could have long-term implications for the health of the region and its significant impact on the functionality of the global ecosystem. Models suggest that the Amazon may be reaching a tipping point due to the deforestation and rising temperatures.

Under Jair Bolsonaro's government, who took office in January 2019, policies surrounding deforestation have relaxed. Bolsonaro and other senior figures have encouraged the exploitation of the Amazon rainforest, denigrated critics and denied man-made climate change. Some environmental laws have been weakened and there has been a cut in funding and personnel at key government agencies and a firing of the heads of the agency's state bodies.

In 2019 an initiative has been made by the NGO RioTerra and the organization Reforest’Action. This initiative is intended to make more efforts to reduce deforestation and restore degraded areas. Slash-and-burn farming is a big part of the problem in the fight against deforestation, and this is something that is focused on in this project. The goal is to plant 120,000 trees, use agroforestry to reduce deforestation, help diversify forest fruit production, store carbon to fight climate change, and provide food security. Agroforestry is a way of agriculture in forested areas combining planting and managing trees with farming and cattle ranching. The project should benefit from multiple environmental problems caused by deforestation like conserving biodiversity, improving the water cycle and generating income for the local population from the sale of non-wood products and fruit providing more food security. Not to mention that the trees act as carbon storage, caused by cutting and burning trees. Besides that, the planting of trees helps restore cleared or burned areas of land and make agroforestry possible.

See also
 2018 in Brazil
 2019 Amazon rainforest wildfires
 Agriculture in Brazil
 Amazon rainforest § Deforestation
 Carbon Border Adjustment Mechanism
 Coffee plantation
 Coffee production in Brazil
 Deforestation of the Amazon Rainforest
 Environment of Brazil
 Environmental issues in Brazil
 Environmental history of Latin America
 Stern Review's cost estimates of climate change
 Rainforest Alliance

References

External links

Images of deforestation in the Amazon
Reversing deforestation in Brazil? an academic article
Mecanismos y actors Sociales en la deforestación de la Amazonia brasileña

Cattle Ranching in the Amazon Region. Yale School of Forestry & Environmental Studies

Environmental issues in Brazil
Brazil
Forestry in Brazil
Environmental disasters in South America